KDMA-FM (93.9 FM) is a radio station licensed to Granite Falls, Minnesota. KDMA-FM airs a full-service/country music format,  simulcasting with sister station KDMA, and is owned by Iowa City Broadcasting Company, Inc.

Previous logo

References

External links

Country radio stations in the United States
Radio stations in Minnesota
Radio stations established in 1994
1994 establishments in Minnesota